Elections were held in Haliburton County, Ontario on October 24, 2022 in conjunction with municipal elections across the province.

Haliburton County Council
The Haliburton County Council consists of the mayors and deputy mayors of the four constituent municipalities. A warden is elected from the eight members.

Algonquin Highlands
The following were the results for mayor of Algonquin Highlands.

Dysart et al
Former mayor Murray Fearrey was acclaimed as mayor of Dysart et al.

Highlands East
Mayor Dave Burton ran against Cheryl Ellis in a re-match of the 2018 election.

Minden Hills
Township councillor Bob Carter was acclaimed as mayor of Minden Hills.

References

Haliburton
Haliburton County